The Cut was a television reality show for world class fashion designers hosted and sponsored by fashion designer and billionaire Tommy Hilfiger. Sixteen designers split into new teams each week to complete tasks, with a player eliminated each round. The show debuted on CBS, and shifted timeslots through the summer. Of note was the catch phrase Hilfiger used for each elimination ("you're out of style"), celebrity appearances, and the New York City setting. The winner had the opportunity to design a clothing line for HIllfiger.

In the final, three contestants, Shante "Princess" Warren, Elizabeth Saab, and Chris Cortez, were allowed to bring back former teammates to help design a window display. Hilfiger chose Cortez as the winner.

References

External links
 
 

Fashion-themed reality television series
2000s American reality television series
2005 American television series debuts
2005 American television series endings
CBS original programming
Tommy Hilfiger (company)